Marin Čilić was the two-time defending champion; however, he was eliminated by Florian Mayer in the quarterfinals.
Ivan Dodig claimed the first ATP title of his career, by defeating Michael Berrer 6–3, 6–4 in the final match.

Seeds
First four seeds received a bye into the second round.

  Marin Čilić (quarterfinals)
  Ivan Ljubičić (quarterfinals)
  Guillermo García-López (semifinals)
  Richard Gasquet (quarterfinals, retired)
  Florian Mayer (semifinals)
  Marcel Granollers (first round)
  Philipp Petzschner (second round)
  Michael Berrer (final)

Qualifying

Draw

Finals

Top half

Bottom half

References
 Main Draw
 Qualifying Draw

PBZ Zagreb Indoors - Singles
Zagreb Indoors
2011 PBZ Zagreb Indoors